Dolores is a municipality in the Honduran department of Intibucá.

Demographics
At the time of the 2013 Honduras census, Dolores municipality had a population of 5,140. Of these, 85.70% were Indigenous (85.56% Lenca), 9.48% Mestizo, 3.53% White, 1.26% Afro-Honduran or Black and 0.02% others.

References

Municipalities of the Intibucá Department